Events from the year 1372 in Ireland.

Incumbent
Lord: Edward III

Deaths
Seán Mór Ó Dubhagáin, Gaelic poet.

References

 
1370s in Ireland
Ireland
Years of the 14th century in Ireland